Richard Albert Tilghman (March 8, 1920 – February 23, 2017) was a politician who served as a Republican member of the Pennsylvania State Senate for the 17th district from 1969 to 2001.  He also served in the Pennsylvania House of Representatives for the Montgomery County district from 1967 to 1968. He died on February 23, 2017, at the age of 96.

Early life
Tilghman was born in Manchester, England, to Benjamin Chew and Eliza Middleton Fox Tilghman.  He graduated from the Fountain Valley School in Colorado, Princeton University in 1943 and the Berlitz School of Languages.  He served as a First lieutenant in the U.S. Marine Corps during World War II and received the Silver Star for action during the battle of Iwo Jima.

Business career
He worked at Smith & Barney, at the General Coal Company and as a plastics manufacturing executive at Contour Manufacturing Company.

Political career
He served as Chairman of the Appropriations Committee from 1974 to 2001.

As State Senator, he was an advocate for veteran organizations.  He supported state funding for the construction of the Pennsylvania Veterans Memorial at Indiantown Gap National Cemetery.  In 1999, he sponsored legislation providing $2 million in funding to support the construction of the National World War II Memorial in Washington D.C.

References

External links
 - official PA Senate website (archived)

1920 births
2017 deaths
20th-century American politicians
21st-century American politicians
United States Marine Corps personnel of World War II
Republican Party Pennsylvania state senators
Republican Party members of the Pennsylvania House of Representatives
Politicians from Manchester
Princeton University alumni
Recipients of the Silver Star
British emigrants to the United States